The Mail and Empire was formed from the 1895 merger of The Toronto Mail (owned by Charles Alfred Riordan and managed by Christopher W. Bunting) and Toronto Empire newspapers, both conservative newspapers in Toronto, Ontario, Canada. It acquired the assets of The Toronto World in 1921, and merged with The Globe in 1936 to form The Globe and Mail.

See also
 List of newspapers in Canada

References

Newspapers published in Toronto
Publications established in 1895
Defunct newspapers published in Ontario
Publications disestablished in 1936
The Globe and Mail
Conservative media in Canada
Daily newspapers published in Ontario
1895 establishments in Ontario
1936 disestablishments in Ontario